The Cathedral of Saint John the Baptist   or simply Lublin Cathedral in Lublin, Poland is the cathedral church of the Roman Catholic Archdiocese of Lublin.

It was built between 1592 and 1617 as a church of the Society of Jesus. One of the first baroque churches in Poland, it was modeled after the Chiesa del Gesù in Rome of Giovanni Maria Bernadoni. It is a three-aisled basilica with a wide nave.. It was designated cathedral in the early 19th century, and since 1992, the archdiocesan cathedral.

See also
 Catholic Church in Poland
 List of Jesuit sites

References

Roman Catholic cathedrals in Poland
Buildings and structures in Lublin
Roman Catholic churches completed in 1617
17th-century Roman Catholic church buildings in Poland
Baroque church buildings in Poland